Bucculatrix myricae is a moth in the family Bucculatricidae. It was described by Émile Louis Ragonot in 1879. It is found in France, Spain, Portugal and Romania.

The wingspan is about 7 mm.

The larvae feed on Myrica species. They mine the leaves of their host plant. The mine has the form of a gallery with blackish frass. Older larvae live freely on the leaf and cause upper-surface window feeding. Larvae can be found in July.

References

Natural History Museum Lepidoptera generic names catalog

Bucculatricidae
Moths described in 1879
Moths of Europe
Leaf miners